Mustafa al’Absi, Ph.D. is a Professor of Behavioral Medicine and the holder of the Max & Mary La Due Pickworth Chair at University of Minnesota Medical School. Dr. al'Absi also holds faculty positions at Department of Family Medicine, Department of Biomedical Sciences, Department of Neurosciences, and the Integrated Biological Science Program. He is the founding director of the Duluth Medical Research Institute (DMRI), the Behavioral Medicine Laboratories, and the Khat Research Program (KRP).  Dr. al’Absi completed his undergraduate education at Cairo University and his doctoral training at the University of Oklahoma in biological psychology with specialization in clinical psychology and behavioral medicine.

After completing his graduate training in 1997, Dr. al’Absi joined the University of Minnesota Medical School. Dr. al’Absi directs research programs focusing on neurobiology of stress, appetite regulation, and addiction. Dr. al'Absi's research programs have been funded by grants from the National Institute of Health, National Institute on Drug Abuse, the National Cancer Institute, the National Health, Lung, and Blood Institute, and the American Heart Association.

In addition, Dr. al'Absi has chaired various national and international scientific committees and functions, and has received several honorary awards, including the Neal E. Miller Young Investigator Award from the Academy for Behavioral Medicine Research and the Herbert Weiner Early Career Award from the American Psychosomatic Society.

Education 
Undergraduate: Cairo University; Graduate: University of Oklahoma

Published Research
Prof. al’Absi has published more than 200 scientific articles and several books and book chapters. His research has been published in high-impact journals including the journal Nature, New England Journal of Medicine, and JAMA. He has also published multiple books and chapters. Including his book Stress and Addiction: Biological and Psychological Mechanisms, which was published by Elsevier Academic Press  and considered an important reference on the topic in clinical research. The introduction to the book was written by George Koob from the Scripps. Dr. al’Absi has also recently published his book Neuroscience of Pain, Stress, and Emotion. He has also guest-edited special issues for Psychosomatic Medicine, Biological Psychology, and served as an associate editor for Psychophysiology and Biological Psychology.

References

University of Minnesota faculty
Living people
Cairo University alumni
University of Oklahoma alumni
Year of birth missing (living people)